28 Pashons - Coptic calendar - 30 Pashons

Fixed commemorations
All fixed commemorations below are observed on 29 Pashons (6 June) by the Coptic Orthodox Church.

Saints
Saint Simeon the Stylite (175 A.M.), (459 A.D.)

References
Coptic Synexarion

Days of the Coptic calendar